Ellen Lahn (19 January 1918 - 30 August 2004) was a Norwegian politician for the Socialist Left Party.

She served as a deputy representative to the Norwegian Parliament from Hordaland during the term 1973–1977, representing the Socialist Electoral League.

See also
Politics of Norway

References

1918 births
Deputy members of the Storting
Socialist Left Party (Norway) politicians
Hordaland politicians
2004 deaths